Voldemar Puhk (11 December 1897, Viljandi – 3 May 1937, Tallinn) was an Estonian diplomat, businessman, economist and politician.

1918–1919 he was the acting Minister of Commerce and Industry. He is buried at Tallinn's Forest Cemetery.

References

1897 births
1937 deaths
Estonian diplomats
Estonian businesspeople
Government ministers of Estonia
University of Tartu alumni
People from Viljandi
Burials at Metsakalmistu